The political philosophy of anarchism has had a small presence in New Zealand politics.

Timeline 

 1859 – Arthur Desmond born.
 1901 July – The loosely organised New Zealand Socialist Party was formed and included syndicalists and anarchists. The Wellington group became a centre for anti-parliamentary socialists.
 1908 – New Zealand Socialist Party has 3000 members and holds its first national conference. The conference condemns political action by a two to one majority.
 1910 – Anarchists within the Christchurch branch of the Socialist Party leave to form an IWW Recruiting Union.
 9 July 1913 – The Freedom Group is set up by Philip Josephs in Wellington and lasts for a year. Rumor has it they have running battles with Police during the Great Strike.
 1966 – Bill Dwyer convicted for calling the Queen a bludger whilst speaking in Auckland in 1966.
 1982 – Wanganui Computer Centre bombing
 1995 May 1 – The Freedom Shop opens.
 2008 - Aotearoa Workers Solidarity Movement (AWSM) is formed, reflecting a Platformist viewpoint.

Anarchists 

 Arthur Desmond
 Lola Ridge
 Alexander William Bickerton (1842–1929) was the first professor of chemistry at Canterbury College (now called the University of Canterbury) in Christchurch, New Zealand. He is best known for teaching and mentoring Ernest Rutherford. He formed a socialist community in Christchurch called the "Federative Home".
 Tom Barker
 Philip Josephs (anarchist) (1876–1946) was a Latvian-born Jew who was an active member of the Wellington Socialist Party. In July 1913 he helped establish New Zealand's first anarchist collective Freedom Group, and was the main distributor of anarchist literature in New Zealand.
 Ubi Dwyer
 Simon Cottle was an active member of the Wellington punk and anarchists scenes, known for his "spasmodically" published magazine 'Anti-System' later known as 'Social Dis-Ease.'

See also 
Environmental movement in New Zealand
Feminism in New Zealand
Māori politics
Republicanism in New Zealand
Socialism in New Zealand

References

Works cited 

 Boraman, Toby (2007) Rabble rousers and merry pranksters: a history of anarchism in Aotearoa/New Zealand from the mid-1950s to the early 1980s
 Davidson, J. (2011). Remains to be Seen: Tracing Joe Hill's ashes in New Zealand, Wellington: Rebel Press.

Further reading

History 

 Buchanan, Sam (2010) "Anarchism in Aotearoa/New Zealand" 
 Davidson, Jared (2013) "Sewing Freedom: Philip Josephs, Transnationalism & Early New Zealand Anarchism" – AK Press
 Fry, E.C. (1965) "Tom Barker & the I.W.W."
 Nettlau, Max (Unknown) "Die Geschichte Des Anarchismus" ("the History of Anarchism") see Chapter 10 "Anarchist propaganda and Industrial Unionism in Australia and New Zealand."

Other 

 Anarchism and Feminism. Christchurch: Libertarian Press, 1995. A reprint of articles by Margaret Flaws and the Auckland Anarcho-Feminist Huddle from the 1970s.
 Bolstad, Richard. An Anarchist Analysis of the Chinese Revolution. Christchurch: Christchurch Anarchy Group, 1976.
 Bolstad, R. The Industrial Front: An Introduction to the Past Lessons, Present Tactics and Future Possibilities of the Struggle for Worker Self-Management . For Those Who Already Had a Suspicion There was Something Wrong With Work as it is. Christchurch: Christchurch Anarchy Group, c. 1977.
 Boraman, Toby. "The New Left in New Zealand" in on the Left: Essays on Socialism in New Zealand, eds. Pat Moloney and Kerry Taylor. Dunedin: Otago University Press, 2002, pp. 117–32.
 Boraman, T. "The New Left and Anarchism in New Zealand From the Mid-1950s to the Early 1980s: An Anarchist Communist Interpretation." PhD thesis, University of Otago, Dunedin, 2006.
 Buchanan, Sam. Anarchy: The Transmogrification of Everyday Life. Wellington: Committee for the Establishment of Civilisation, * 1999.
 Buis, Simon. The Brutus Festival. Auckland: Auckland Copy Centre, 1969.
 Churton, Wade. "Have You Checked the Children?" Punk and Postpunk Music in New Zealand, 1977.1981. Christchurch: Put Your Foot Down Publishing, 1999.
 Cumming, Allan. Understanding Nonviolence. Dunedin: Dunedin Nonviolent Action Resource Group, 1983.
 Cumming, A. How Nonviolence Works. Dunedin: Nonviolent Action Network in Aotearoa, 1985.
 Droescher, Werner. "The Little Black and Red Book of Anarchism." Unpublished manuscript, 1977.
 Droescher, W. "Toward an Alternative Society." Unpublished manuscript, 1978. University of Auckland Library.
 Dwyer, Bill. [writing under the pseudonym B. Langford]. "Anarchism in New Zealand." Red and Black. 1 (1965), pp. 33–35.
 Gramaphone, Malcolm. Get Lushed on Your Own Grog: An Underground Brewer's Bible. Dunedin: Kropotkin Press, 1972.
 Innes, Wayne. Don't Pay Taxes. Auckland: Social Analysis, 1978.
 Innes, W. How to Survive in Suburbia. Auckland: Pupuke Press, 1981.
 Prebble, F. "Jock Barnes and the Syndicalist Tradition in New Zealand." Thrall. 14 (July/August 2000), pp. 4–5.
 Sargent, Lyman T. "Beeville: An Anarchist Commune in New Zealand, 1933–1973." Paper delivered at the Sixth International Communal Studies Association meeting, Amsterdam, 1998.
 Sargent, L. and Lucy Sargisson. Living in Utopia: New Zealand's Intentional Communities. Aldershot and Burlington: Ashgate, 2004.
 Suggate, Richard. "Anarchism in New Zealand 1900.1965 and Today."  Freedom. 28 Aug. 1982, pp. 4–5.

External links 

 
New Zealand